The men's artistic individual all-around competition at the 2010 Asian Games in Guangzhou, China was held on 13 and 15 November 2010 at the Asian Games Town Gymnasium.

Schedule
All times are China Standard Time (UTC+08:00)

Results 
Legend
DNS — Did not start

Qualification

Final

References

Results

External links
Official website

Artistic Men Individual